Microlechia is a genus of moths in the family Gelechiidae.

Species
 Microlechia chretieni Turati, 1924
 Microlechia iranica (Povolný, 1976)
 Microlechia karsholti (Nupponen, 2010)
 Microlechia klimeschi (Povolný, 1972)
 Microlechia lycia (Li, 2001)
 Microlechia lyciella (Falkovitsh & Bidzilya, 2003)
 Microlechia maculata (Povolný, 1978)
 Microlechia melongenae (Povolný & Bradley, 1980)
 Microlechia rhamnifoliae (Amsel & Hering, 1931)

References

 , 2007, Esperiana Buchreihe zur Entomologie Memoir 4: 91-116.
 , 2010: The gelechiid fauna of the southern Ural Mountains, part I: descriptions of seventeen new species (Lepidoptera: Gelechiidae). Zootaxa 2366: 1-34. Abstract: http://www.mapress.com/zootaxa/2010/f/z02366p034f.pdf].
 , 2001: A new species of the genus Hedma (Lepidoptera: Gelechiidae)injurious to Lycium barbarum. Acta Entomologica Sinica 44 (2): 227-230. Abstract: .

 
Gnorimoschemini